The Systo Palty is annual open-air art music festival held near St. Petersburg, Russia.

See also

List of electronic music festivals
Live electronic music

References

External links
Systo 2010 review

Music festivals established in 2004
Electronic music festivals in Russia
Trance festivals